Henry Turner Leverett is an American sport shooter. He has qualified to represent the United States at the 2020 Summer Olympics. He is the younger brother of Jack Leverett III who is also a sport shooter. He is pistol shooter for Ohio State in the 25m rapid fire category.

References

2001 births
Living people
American male sport shooters
Olympic shooters of the United States
Shooters at the 2020 Summer Olympics
People from Bainbridge, Georgia
21st-century American people